British Polar Engines is a manufacturer of diesel engines based in Glasgow, Scotland. The company has over seventy years' experience in the manufacture and supply of spare parts for diesel engines. The engine and company take their name from the engine supplied to Amundsen's Fram, from which he conquered the South Pole.

Company

British Polar Engines manufactures, supplies and installs  medium speed marine diesel engines and industrial generating sets. Their engines are in a variety of vessels, including ferries, warships, fishing boats and small tugs. They supply suitable replacement parts for a variety of engines, including all E, I, M, N and T ranges of Polar engines and former NOHAB and Wärtsilä engines. They also supply a full range of parts for the Admiralty Standard Range ASR1 engines found in s and - and s.

The works have been organised to provide a continuous flow of engine components through the machines to the assembly bays. Extended inspection, test bed and storage facilities contribute to increased output of finished engines. The company are specialists in the servicing and maintenance of diesel engines for all applications. It inspects, machines and overhauls all engine components, including crankshafts, cylinder heads, connecting rods, fuel equipment and engine pumps.

Polar diesel engines
The first Polar two-cycle engine was installed in a seagoing vessel in 1907. In 1911, the first motor vessel to cross the Atlantic, the Swan Hunter-built ore-carrier Toiler, was powered by a Polar engine. At about the same time Roald Amundsen in  the Fram was conquering the South Pole, and it is from that successful expedition that the engine derives its name.

Other ships that have made history with Polar engines include the Girl Pat, the rescue tugs ,  and Canadian sealer, chosen for the 1956 Commonwealth Trans-Antarctic Expedition.

British Polar engines were of the two-cycle type, built under licence from Nydqvist & Holm, Trollhättan, Sweden. Their development has continued over the years. The basic design with airless injection was introduced in 1928. It was an immediate success: reliable, economic, easy to manoeuvre and remarkably simple in design and construction. This early design has been developed and extended to a wide range of engine sizes covering powers from  without supercharging.

In 2000, the company purchased Kelvin Diesels, concentrating engine production at Helen Street in Glasgow.

Footnotes

External links
 British Polar Engines

Manufacturing companies of Scotland
Companies based in Glasgow
Diesel engine manufacturers
Marine engine manufacturers
History of Glasgow
Engine manufacturers of the United Kingdom